Botryosphaeria cocogena is a fungus species in the family Botryosphaeriaceae. Originally discovered in the Brazilian Amazon rainforest, it is a plant pathogen that causes blight in coconut leaves.

References

cocogena
Fungi described in 1994
Fungal plant pathogens and diseases
Coconut palm diseases